Edward Shumaker (January 27, 1896 – May 27, 1973) was an American sports shooter. He competed in the 50 m rifle, prone event at the 1932 Summer Olympics.

References

1896 births
1973 deaths
American male sport shooters
Olympic shooters of the United States
Shooters at the 1932 Summer Olympics
People from Beaver, Pennsylvania
Sportspeople from Pennsylvania